Runaway Train EP was the third of a trio of limited edition EP releases from the British band Kid Galahad that led up to the release of their debut album Gold Dust Noise the following summer.  The title track "Runaway Train" was recorded in the studio and was produced by Jim Abbiss who had previously worked with artists such as UNKLE and DJ Shadow.  Whilst the other three tracks were demo recordings produced by the band before signing to Ignition Records.

"Runaway Train" featured in the UK Channel 4 comedy drama Teachers.


Track listing
All tracks written by A.Bull, D.Ody, P.Seaman, D.Strows
"Runaway Train"
"Dream it all Away"
"Brand New Shoes"
"Darklight"


Personnel
Ash Bull – vocals
Dave Ody – Guitar
Paul Seaman – Bass guitar
D. "Wookie" Strows – drums
Jim Abbiss – Production and Mixing (Tracks 1)
Kid Galahad - Production and Mixing (Tracks 2, 3 and 4)

References

Kid Galahad (band) albums
2001 EPs